Polyperchon (sometimes written Polysperchon; ; b. between 390–380 BC – d. after 304 BC, possibly into 3rd century BC), was a Macedonian Greek general who served both Philip II and Alexander the Great and then played an active role in the ensuing battles for control between Alexander's generals.

Early career 
Polyperchon was a son of Simmias from Tymphaia in Epirus.  He served under Philip II and Alexander the Great, accompanying Alexander throughout his long journeys.  After the Battle of Issus in 333, Polyperchon was given command of the Tymphaean battalion of the phalanx which he retained until 324.

After his return to Babylon, Polyperchon (along with other veterans) was sent back to Macedon with Craterus, but had only reached Cilicia by the time of Alexander's death in 323. Craterus was to replace Antipater as Macedonia's regent, but was of poor health. Poyperchon was to succeed Craterus in case the latter wouldn't be able to govern. Polyperchon and Craterus continued onto Greece.

As Craterus'  second in command Polyperchon acted as governor of Macedon and helped Antipater to defeat the Greek rebellion in the Lamian War. Polyperchon defeated the Thessalian cavalry of Menon, which was hitherto considered practically invincible.

Following the First War of the Diadochi, Polyperchon remained in Macedon while Antipater travelled to Asia Minor to assert his regency over the whole empire.

Regent 
Upon Antipater's death in 319, Polyperchon was appointed regent and supreme commander of the entire empire but soon fell into conflict with Antipater's son Cassander, who was to have been his chief lieutenant.  The two fell into civil war, which quickly spread among all the successors of Alexander, with Polyperchon allying with Eumenes against Cassander, Antigonus and Ptolemy.

Although Polyperchon was initially successful in securing control of the Greek cities, whose freedom he proclaimed, he suffered a major setback at Megalopolis in 317 BC, a few months later his fleet was destroyed by Antigonus, and Cassander secured control of Athens the year after that. Shortly thereafter, Polyperchon was driven from Macedon by Cassander, who took control of the disabled king Philip Arrhidaeus and his wife Eurydice.  Polyperchon fled to Epirus, where he joined Alexander's mother Olympias, widow Roxana, and infant son Alexander IV.  He formed an alliance with Olympias and King Aeacides of Epirus, and Olympias led an army into Macedon.  She was initially successful, defeating and capturing the army of King Philip, whom she had murdered, but soon Cassander returned from the Peloponnesus and captured and murdered her in 316, taking Roxana and the boy king into his custody.

Alliance with Antigonus 
Polyperchon now fled to the Peloponnesus, where he still controlled a few strong points, and allied himself with Antigonus, who had by now fallen out with his former allies. Polyperchon surrendered the regency to Antigonus.  Polyperchon soon controlled much of the Peloponnesus, including Corinth and Sicyon.  Following the peace treaty of 311 between Antigonus and his enemies, and the murder of the boy-king Alexander and his mother, Polyperchon retained these areas, and when war again broke out between Antigonus and the others, Antigonus sent Alexander's reputed illegitimate son Heracles to Polyperchon as a bargaining chip to use against Cassander.  Polyperchon, however, decided to break with Antigonus and murdered the boy in 309.

Later life 
There is no certain date for Polyperchon's death. He is last mentioned as being alive in 304, but the lack of further reference is only because Diodorus' subsequent narrative is lost and no others cover this period in sufficient detail. A mention in Plutarch's Life of Pyrrhus 8.3 suggests that he might have lived into the early 3rd century BC.

Polyperchon had a son named Alexander who participated in the Wars of the Diadochi, first under his father, then in league with Cassander.

Notes

References

External links
Livius, Polyperchon by Jona Lendering
Polyperchon entry in historical source book by Mahlon H. Smith

4th-century BC viceregal rulers
4th-century BC Greek people
Regents of Macedonia (ancient kingdom)
Ancient Macedonian generals
Ancient Tymphaeans
Generals of Alexander the Great
4th-century BC Macedonians
Year of birth unknown
300s BC deaths